Juan Manuel González Barrón (born August 12, 1965) is a Mexican luchador (Spanish for "professional wrestler") who is best known under the ring name Dr. Wagner Jr., having used that name since 1987. He is the son of Manuel González Rivera, better known as Dr. Wagner and the brother of the late César Cuauhtémoc González Barrón, who worked primarily under the name Silver King. His son made his lucha libre debut 2009 under the ring name El Hijo de Dr. Wagner Jr. González was once married to professional wrestler María Moreno León, better known as Rossy Moreno.

While he has worked all over the world as Dr. Wagner Jr. he primarily works in Mexico and has worked with both Consejo Mundial de Lucha Libre (CMLL) and Lucha Libre AAA Worldwide (AAA), Mexico's two largest professional wrestling promotions, on multiple occasions as well as being a regular on the Mexican independent circuit. He was introduced to Lucha Underground at the end of season two and has worked for various Japanese promotions, most notably for New Japan Pro-Wrestling (NJPW).

During his career he has won such notable championships as the AAA Mega Championship on three occasions, been the inaugural AAA Latin American Champion, held the CMLL World Light Heavyweight Championship twice, the CMLL World Tag Team Championship on four occasions with four partners, the CMLL World Trios Championship four times, as part of four teams, the NWA World Light Heavyweight Championship and the IWGP Junior Heavyweight Tag Team Championship with Kendo Kashin.

González worked under a mask from his debut in 1985 until August 2017, when he was forced to unmask after losing to Psycho Clown in a Lucha de Apuestas at Triplemanía XXV. Following the unmasking, González renamed himself Rey Wagner ("King Wagner").

Personal life
Juan Manuel González Barrón was born on August 12, 1965, son of Magdalena Barrón and her husband Manuel González Rivera, better known as the luchador (professional wrestler) Dr. Wagner. Juan González was the second son born, with his brother Óscar being two years his elder. His parents later had another son, César Cuauhtémoc González Barrón and finally a daughter Mayra. At one point in the late 1980s to 1990s Juan González was married to María del Rocío Moreno León, who is also a professional wrestler under the name Rossy Moreno, and together the couple had at least two sons, El Hijo de Dr. Wagner Jr. and Galeno del Mal. Juan González' sons' names are not a matter of public knowledge as they wrestle as enmascarados, which traditionally means that their personal informations are kept from the general public per lucha libre traditions. Juan González later remarried, although it is unclear if his current wife is directly involved with lucha libre or not. In the early 2000s César González introduced the wrestling world to a son, referred to only as "El Hijo de Silver King", who at the time was training to be a wrestler.

Professional wrestling career
González started out working as a masked wrestler known as El Invasor ("The Invader"). The anonymity of the El Invasor character allowed González to gain in-ring experience without the pressure of the Dr. Wagner name. González only worked as El Invasor for about a year before it was decided to reveal his family relationship.

González was slated to make his in-ring debut as Dr. Wagner Jr. in a match where he would team up with his father, to take on his father's former tag team partner Ángel Blanco and Ángel Blanco Jr. on April 27, 1986. While driving to the show the car, carrying his father, José Vargas (Ángel Blanco), El Solar, Mano Negra and Jungla Negra crashed when one of the tires exploded. Vargas was killed by the crash and González' father suffered severe spinal damage. Manuel González would later use a wheelchair to accompany his son to the ring for some matches.

Universal Wrestling Association (1987–1993)
After adopting his father's name Dr. Wagner Jr. he also began working for the Universal Wrestling Association (UWA), the same promotion where his father worked for most of his career. Promoters played off the rivalry of their famous fathers and often paired Dr. Wagner Jr. against Ángel Blanco Jr.  On August 3, 1986 the two rivals were teamed up for a Ruleta de la Muerte ("Roulette of Death") tournament where the losing teams advance and the team that lost the finals would have to wrestle each other in a Lucha de Apuestas, or "bet match", for their masks. The rivals defeated Mano Negra and Aníbal to survive the tournament with their masks intact. On July 22, 1990 Dr. Wagner Jr. defeated Astro de Oro to win the UWA World Junior Heavyweight Championship, his first professional wrestling championship. He held the title for 218 days, until February 25, 1991, when he lost it to Enrique Vega.

Consejo Mundial de Lucha Libre (1993–2009)
In the early 1990s the UWA's popularity began to dwindle as less and less fans attended their shows. To try and combat the fan departure the UWA began working with long time rival promotion Consejo Mundial de Lucha Libre (CMLL), co-promoting shows and allowing UWA workers to also compete on CMLL shows. On April 2, 1993 the collaboration between the two companies led to Dr. Wagner Jr. defeating Pierroth Jr. to win the CMLL World Light Heavyweight Championship. Later that year the two promotions worked together to host a tournament for the newly created CMLL World Tag Team Championship with teams from the UWA and CMLL competing against each other. Dr. Wagner Jr. was teamed up with UWA's top name El Canek for the tournament, defeating the team of Vampiro and Pierroth Jr. in the finals to become the first CMLL World Tag Team Champions. Dr. Wagner Jr.'s first reign as CMLL World Light Heavyweight Champion ended on March 2, 1994 as he was defeated by Atlantis. By early 1994 Dr. Wagner Jr. began teaming with Gran Markus Jr. and El Hijo del Gladiador on a regular basis, forming a team known as La Nueva Ola Blanca ("The New White Wave"), adopting the name of his father's tag team. La Nueva Ola Blanca won the CMLL World Trios Championship on April 22, 1994 when they defeated Los Brazos (El Brazo, Brazo de Oro and Brazo de Plata). In November of that year El Canek stopped working for CMLL, forcing Dr. Wagner Jr. to give up his half of the world tag team championship. In early 1997 Dr. Wagner Jr. and Silver King won the CMLL World Tag Team Championship, but once again Dr. Wagner Jr. was forced to give up his half, this time because Silver King left CMLL to work for the US based World Championship Wrestling (WCW). He later won the championship for a third time, this time with Emilio Charles Jr. as his tag team partner. He later won the CMLL World Trips Championship on three additional occasions, with Black Warrior and Blue Panther, then with Blue Panther and Fuerza Guerrera, and finally with Black Tiger (his brother under a new ring identity) and Universo 2000.

On June 18, 2004, on a CMLL show in Mexico City, Dr. Wagner Jr. defeated long time rival El Canek to win the UWA World Heavyweight Championship, a title still promoted 10 years after the UWA closed. The championship change was part of a long running storyline between the two, a storyline set to culminate in a four-way Lucha de Apuestas match at the CMLL 71st Anniversary Show. In the week prior to the show Manuel González died, which led to a surge of sympathy for Dr. Wagner Jr. This led to the crowd being solidly behind the until-then hated Dr. Wagner Jr. as he put his mask on the line against El Canek, Universo 2000 and Rayo de Jalisco Jr. In the end El Canek defeated Universo 2000 to take his mask. As result of the newfound popularity of Dr. Wagner Jr. CMLL decided to turn El Canek rudo (villain), allowing for the rivalry to continue. Later on when Dr. Wagner Jr. moved on to a feud with Atlantis, the story repeated itself as the crowd turned against Atlantis, forcing CMLL to turn him from técnico (hero or good guy) into one of the bad guys of the storyline. The rivalry continued for several months until Dr. Wagner Jr.'s focus shifted to newcomer L.A. Park, resulting in a series of very violent, out of control matches between the two.

On April 27, 2008, Wagner led a protest march for anyone who believed they were being mistreated by their bosses to join. About 200 people joined the march, including Fuerza Guerrera and wrestlers from IWRG. Wagner claimed he was not being used because he criticized CMLL in the press, and claimed he was in talks with World Wrestling Entertainment (WWE). The rivalry between Dr. Wagner Jr. and L.A Park reached its CMLL climax at the CMLL 75th Anniversary Show where Dr. Wagner Jr. and L.A. Park wrestled each other in a match that ended in a disqualification due to excessive brawling outside the ring. A short time later Dr. Wagner Jr. was fired from CMLL, officially for breaking CMLL's strict rule about not bleeding during matches or using weapons.

Japan (1988–2004)
Starting in 1988 Dr. Wagner Jr. began making regular trips to Japan primarily working for New Japan Pro-Wrestling (NJPW) through their relationship with the UWA. Later on he would also work for the Japanese Wrestling International New Generations (W*ING) and Big Japan Pro Wrestling (BJW) promotions. During a BJW tour in 1996 Dr. Wagner Jr. lost the CMLL World Light Heavyweight Championship to Aquarius and then regained it 8 days later.  The title change was not sanctioned by CMLL and not officially recognized in Mexico. In 1997 he participated in Best of the Super Juniors IV, where he defeated Doc Dean and Chavo Guerrero Jr. but lost the remaining four matches and failed to advance. The following year Dr. Wagner Jr. was invited back for the 1998 Best of the Super Juniors tournament. He won his block with a total of four victories, but lost in the finals to Koji Kanemoto.

Later that same year he teamed up with Kendo Kashin to compete for the newly created IWGP Junior Heavyweight Tag Team Championship, losing in the tournament final to Shinjiro Otani and Tatsuhito Takaiwa. When Dr. Wagner Jr. returned to Japan in 1999 Wagner and Kashin won the junior heavyweight tag team championship on January 4 on NJPW's Wrestling World 1999 in the Tokyo Dome. The following month Dr. Wagner Jr. unsuccessfully fought Jyushin Thunder Liger for the IWGP Junior Heavyweight Championship. The reign with the IWGP Junior Heavyweight Tag Team Championship ended after 96 days, with two successful defenses, before losing the belts to The Great Sasuke and Jyushin Thunder Liger on April 10, 1999.

For the third year in a row Dr. Wagner Jr. competed in the annual Best of the Super Juniors tournament, a tournament won by Dr. Wagner Jr.'s former partner Kendo Kashin. In 2003 Dr. Wagner Jr and his brother Silver King toured with All Japan Pro Wrestling (AJPW) instead of NJPW, working primarily as a tag team for the entirety of the tour.

Lucha Libre AAA Worldwide (2009–2013)

On March 15, 2009 Dr. Wagner Jr. made a surprise appearance at Lucha Libre AAA Worldwide (AAA)'s annual Rey de Reyes ("King of Kings") event. First he chased off La Legión Extranjera before turning around to challenge the AAA Mega Champion El Mesias to a title match. On June 13, 2009, at Triplemania XVII Wagner defeated Mesias to win the AAA Mega Championship. After his title win Wagner went on to form the stable Los Wagnermaniacos with Silver King, Electroshock and Último Gladiador. Dr. Wagner Jr. successfully defended the Mega championship against both El Mesias and Cibernético in a Steel Cage Match at the 2009 Verano de Escandalo ("Summer of Scandal") show. At the subsequent AAA event, Heroes Inmortales III, Dr. Wagner Jr. successfully defended against El Mesias once more. Following two successful defenses against El Mesias, Dr. Wagner Jr. stipulated that if El Mesias lost at the 2009 Guerra de Titanes ("War of the Titans") he would not receive another title match. After holding the title for 181 days Dr. Wagner Jr. lost the title back to El Mesias at Guerra de Titanes. In the aftermath of Wagner's stable partner Electroshock winning the AAA Mega Championship at Rey de Reyes in March 2010, Electroshock, Ultimo Gladiator and even Dr. Wagner's own brother, Silver King, all turned on him and kicked him out of the stable, which they renamed Los Maniacos. At Triplemania XVIII Dr. Wagner Jr. pinned Electroshock to win his second AAA Mega Championship. Following the match El Mesias came to the ring, presented Dr. Wagner Jr. with the championship belt and then shook his hand.

On July 12, 2010, Dr. Wagner Jr. made a surprise appearance for CMLL, coming to the aid of his son El Hijo de Dr. Wagner at an event in Nuevo Laredo. Wagner, whose contract with AAA had recently expired, claimed that he was still on good terms with the company and offered no explanation for his appearance.

On August 15, 2010, at Verano de Escandalo Dr. Wagner Jr. successfully defended the AAA Mega Championship in a three-way match against Silver King and Vampiro. After the match Silver King played an audio tape, claiming it was their late father saying that Silver King was the more talented brother. This revelation led to a match on October 1 at Héroes Inmortales IV, where Wagner Jr. defeated Silver King in a singles match, retaining the AAA Mega Championship. On October 31, 2010, Wagner Jr. formed a new alliance named Potencia Mundial (World Power) with Monster Clown, Murder Clown and Psycho Clown. On December 5 at Guerra de Titanes Wagner Jr. lost the AAA Mega Championship to El Zorro. On June 18, 2011, at Triplemanía XIX, Wagner Jr. defeated Total Nonstop Action Wrestling (TNA) performer Rob Van Dam to become the first ever AAA Latin American Champion. Immediately afterwards, Wagner began making challenges towards new AAA Mega Champion Jeff Jarrett. Wagner received his shot at the title on July 31 at Verano de Escándalo in a three-way match, which also included L.A. Park, but was eliminated following a distraction from Karen Jarrett and a low blow from Jarrett. On October 9 at Héroes Inmortales, Dr. Wagner Jr. made his first successful defense of the AAA Latin American Championship by defeating El Hijo del Perro Aguayo in a Bullterrier match. After the match, two of AAA's top técnicos, and Wagner's allies, La Parka and Octagón, both turned on him and joined Aguayo's Los Perros del Mal. On December 16 at Guerra de Titanes, Wagner Jr. lost the AAA Latin American Championship to L.A. Park.

In early 2012, Dr. Wagner Jr. started a rivalry with the invading El Consejo stable. On March 18 at Rey de Reyes, Wagner teamed with Electroshock and Heavy Metal losing to El Consejo members Máscara Año 2000 Jr., El Texano Jr. and Toscano, with Máscara Año 2000 Jr. pinning Wagner following outside interference. The following month, Wagner made peace with Silver King as the two came together to battle El Consejo. On August 5 in the main event of Triplemanía XX, Wagner Jr. defeated Máscara Año 2000 Jr. in a Mask vs. Mask match, forcing his rival to unmask himself. In early 2013, Wagner Jr., claiming dissatisfaction with his position in AAA, left the promotion for a several-month-long stint with El Hijo del Santo's Todo X el Todos promotion, only to return in May in time for Triplemanía XXI. At the event, Dr. Wagner Jr. teamed with Electroshock, La Parka and Octagón to defeat Canek, Máscara Año 2000, Universo 2000 and Villano IV in an eight-man tag team match. Afterwards, the relationship between Wagner and AAA once again broke down with Wagner taking public potshots at the promotion.

Independent circuit (2013–present)
On November 17, 2013, Wagner Jr. returned to CMLL at a small event in Naucalpan, confronting and challenging Mr. Niebla. For the past weeks, Wagner had teased "invading" CMLL and settling his score with the likes of Atlantis and Último Guerrero. In July 2014, Wagner worked a tour of Japan, during which he wrestled for Tokyo Gurentai and women's wrestling promotion World Wonder Ring Stardom.

Return to CMLL (2015)
In August 2015, Wagner made his return to CMLL after an almost 7-year absence. His tenure with CMLL was only brief as CMLL fired Wagner on September 11, after he reportedly told them that taking part in the 82nd Anniversary Show "didn't suit his interests". It was later reported that Wagner decided to not work the anniversary show out of loyalty to L.A. Park, who had been released by the promotion days earlier.

Return to AAA (2014–2020)
A year after leaving AAA, Wagner returned to take part in Triplemanía XXII, putting any past issues behind them. At the event Wagner took part in a four-way elimination main event for the Copa Triplemanía XXII. He was the first man eliminated from the match by Cibernético. Dr. Wagner Jr. did not appear for AAA for the rest of the year, not returning until the 2016 Lucha Libre World Cup tournament in June 2016. Dr. Wagner Jr. teamed up with Rey Mysterio Jr. and Dragon Azteca Jr. as "Team Mexico International" for the tournament, but was eliminated in the second round.

Dr. Wagner Jr. returned to AAA in the fall, shortly after leaving CMLL, as he turned on former tag team partner Rey Mysterio Jr. On August 28, 2016, at Triplemanía XXIV, Wagner fought against El Texano Jr. and Brian Cage for the AAA Mega Championship, but did not win the championship. During the main event of the show, he disrupted a Luchas de Apuestas match between Psycho Clown and Pagano, attacking Psycho Clown. After the match, which Psycho Cown won, Dr. Wagner Jr. challenged Psycho Clown to put his mask on the line in a Lucha de Apuestas at Triplemanía XXV in 2017, a challenge that Psycho Clown accepted. At Héroes Inmortales X Dr. Wagner Jr. defeated Psycho Clown in a match that also included Pagano after Psycho Clown's long time tag team partners, Monster Clown and Murder Clown, turned on him and helped Dr. Wagner Jr. win the match.

On August 26, 2017, Wagner was defeated by Psycho Clown in a Lucha de Apuestas at Triplemanía XXV and was forced to unmask as a result. Afterwards, Wagner continued working for AAA unmasked under the new name "Rey Wagner" ("King Wagner"). On October 4, at Héroes Inmortales XI, Wagner was defeated in a title fight by the AAA Mega Championship against Johnny Mundo. On January 26, in Guerra de Titanes, Wagner defeated Mundo to win his third AAA Mega Championship.

On June 4 at Verano de Escándalo, Wagner was defeated along with Rey Mysterio Jr., thus losing his title to Jeff Jarrett who made his return to the company with the help of Konnan. That same night after the event, Wagner declared himself independent.

On August 3, 2019, at Triplemanía XXVII, Wagner lost a mask vs hair match to Blue Demon Jr. After the match, following his head being shaved, Wagner announced his retirement. However, the next day, Wagner clarified his situation that he is not permanently retired and would have to meet the dates in both AAA and independents. On August 10 in Saltillo, Coahuila, Wagner announced that he finally canceled his retirement to continue his career.

On February 2, 2020, Wagner officially announced his departure from the AAA after appearing at an event in the Naucalpan Arena after six years.

Lucha Underground (2016–2018)
On July 6, 2016, Wagner made his surprise debut for Lucha Underground, making an appearance at Ultima Lucha Dos as a surprise opponent for Son of Havoc. Dr. Wagner Jr. defeated Son of Havoc, with the storyline being that he won a cash prize of $250,000. During season 3 Dr. Wagner Jr. was managed by Famous B and worked a storyline feud with Son of Havoc and Mascarita Sagrada, who had previously been managed by Famous B. He also participated in the "Battle of the Bulls" tournament, but was eliminated by Cage. At Ultima Lucha Tres, Wagner returned and teamed with Famous B to defeat Texano forcing him to become Famous B's new client. However, Wagner would not appear in the fourth season and the series was discontinued after season finale, Ultima Lucha Cuatro.

In other media

In June 2010, Dr. Wagner Jr. won a four-way match to become the wrestler to be featured on the cover of the video game Lucha Libre AAA: Héroes del Ring, which was released on August 9, 2010, in North America. Dr. Wagner Jr. is one of the playable characters in the game.

Championships and accomplishments
Consejo Mundial de Lucha Libre
CMLL World Light Heavyweight Championship (2 times)
CMLL World Tag Team Championship (4 times) – with Canek (1), Silver King (1), Emilio Charles Jr. (1) and Último Guerrero (1)
CMLL World Trios Championship (4 times) – with Gran Markus Jr. and El Hijo del Gladiador (1), Black Warrior and Blue Panther (1), Blue Panther and Fuerza Guerrera (1), and Universo 2000 and Black Tiger III (1)
NWA World Light Heavyweight Championship (1 time)
International Gran Prix (2003)
International Wrestling League
IWL World Heavyweight Championship  (1 time)
Kaoz Lucha Libre
Kaoz Heavyweight Championship (1 time)
Llaves y Candados
LyC Tag Team Championship (1 time) - with Silver King
Lucha Libre AAA Worldwide
AAA Mega Championship (3 times)
AAA Latin American Championship (1 time)
Lucha Libre Premier (2009)
New Japan Pro-Wrestling
IWGP Junior Heavyweight Tag Team Championship (1 time) – with Kendo Kashin
 Pro Wrestling Revolution
PWR World Heavyweight Championship (1 time, current)
Pro Wrestling Illustrated
Ranked No. 16 of the 500 best singles wrestlers in the PWI 500 in 1999 and 2010
Ranked No. 82 of the 500 best singles wrestlers of the "PWI Years" in 2003
Universal Wrestling Association
UWA World Heavyweight Championship (1 time, last)
UWA World Junior Heavyweight Championship (2 times)
World Wrestling Association
WWA World Junior Light Heavyweight Championship (1 time)
Wrestling Observer Newsletter
Wrestling Observer Newsletter Hall of Fame (Class of 2019)

Luchas de Apuestas record

Footnotes

References

General

 
Specific

External links
 
 
 

1965 births
Living people
Masked wrestlers
Mexican male professional wrestlers
Sportspeople from Torreón
Professional wrestlers from Coahuila
Expatriate professional wrestlers in Japan
AAA Mega Champions
IWGP Junior Heavyweight Tag Team Champions
20th-century professional wrestlers
21st-century professional wrestlers
AAA Latin American Champions
CMLL World Light Heavyweight Champions
CMLL World Tag Team Champions
CMLL World Trios Champions
NWA World Light Heavyweight Champions
UWA World Heavyweight Champions
UWA World Junior Heavyweight Champions